The eastern chipmunk (Tamias striatus) is a chipmunk species found in eastern North America. It is the only living member of the chipmunk genus Tamias.

Etymology
The name "chipmunk" comes from the Ojibwe word  ajidamoo (or possibly ajidamoonh, the same word in the Ottawa dialect of Ojibwe), which translates literally as "one who descends trees headlong." First described by Mark Catesby in his 1743 The Natural History of Carolina, Florida, and the Bahama Islands, the chipmunk was eventually classified as Sciurus striatus by Linnaeus, meaning "striped squirrel" in Latin. The scientific name was changed to Tamias striatus, meaning "striped steward," by Johann Illiger in 1811.

Description
It has reddish-brown fur on its upper body and five dark brown stripes contrasting with light brown stripes along its back, ending in a dark tail. It has lighter fur on the lower part of its body. It has a tawny stripe that runs from its whiskers to below its ears, and light stripes over its eyes. It has two fewer teeth than other chipmunks and four toes each on the front legs, but five toes on the hind legs. The chipmunk's appearance "remains consistent throughout life. There is no external difference in appearance between the sexes except the obvious anatomical characteristics of the genitalia during periods of fertility. Molt occurs once or twice annually, during May or June and sometimes again in October. Both albino and melanistic specimens have been observed, but without geographical regularity."

Habitat
The eastern chipmunk lives in deciduous wooded areas and urban parks throughout the eastern United States and southern Canada. It prefers locations with rocky areas, brush or log piles, and shrubs to provide cover.

Behavior
The eastern chipmunk can climb trees well, but constructs underground nests with extensive tunnel systems, often with several entrances. To hide the construction of its burrow, the eastern chipmunk is argued by some to carry soil to a different location in its cheek pouches. However, recorded observations of chipmunks carrying soil in their cheek pouches are extremely limited. John Burroughs is noted as having written that "I used to think that the chipmunk carried away the soil in his cheek pouches, and have so-stated in one of my books [Riverby, 1894], but I am now certain that he does not—only his food stores are thus carried." Chipmunks also line their burrows with leaves, rocks, sticks, and other material, making the burrows even harder to see. "The vocal repertoire of the chipmunk consists of five more or less stereotyped sounds: the chip, the chuck, the trills, the whistle or squeal, and chatter." The chipmunks' trill has been measured to occur at the rate of 130 vibrations per minute.

In a six-year study that tracked 59 resident and 49 transient chipmunks on a 1.5 acre study area in Spotsylvania County, Virginia during the late 1970s, chemistry professor Lawrence Wishner significantly contributed to contemporary published research regarding the Eastern Chipmunk's behavior by drawing on his copious, localized observational data. Wishner noted that "it cannot be overemphasized that the uniqueness of this study lies in its continuous day-to-day observation of 108 individual chipmunks for a period of six years."

Diet

The chipmunk is mainly active during the day, spending most of its day foraging. It prefers bulbs, seeds, fruits, nuts, green plants, mushrooms, insects, worms, and bird eggs. It commonly transports food in pouches in its cheeks.

Lifecycle
The eastern chipmunk defends its burrow and lives a solitary life, except during mating season. In fact, the chipmunk's solitary existence has been noted as "one of the most characteristic behavioral features of the chipmunk," whereas "social interaction of a relatively peaceful nature occurs only during the brief period of courtship and mating, and during the six to eight weeks that the young spend with the mother after birth." Females usually produce one or two litters of three to five young. The two breeding seasons are from February to April and from June to August. During the winter, the chipmunk may enter long periods of hibernation.

Predators of the eastern chipmunk include hawks, owls, foxes, raccoons, snakes, weasels, coyotes, bobcats, lynx, domestic dogs and domestic cats. On average, eastern chipmunks live three or more years in the wild, but in captivity they may live as long as eight years.

Eastern chipmunks are known to be one of many hosts for the parasitic larvae of Cuterebra botflies.

T. s. doorsiensis 
The subspecies Tamias striatus doorsiensis was described in 1971. It is only found in Door, Kewaunee, northeastern Brown, and possibly Manitowoc counties in northeastern Wisconsin. Compared to the other subspecies of eastern chipmunk present in nearby in Michigan and Wisconsin, they have brighter patches behind their ears, grayer hair along their backs, and more white on their tails. It is smaller than T. s. griseus but larger than the least chipmunk (Neotamias minimus).

Gallery

References

External links 

Eastern Chipmunk, Fletcher Wildlife Garden

Tamias
Mammals of Canada
Mammals of the United States
Fauna of the Eastern United States
Mammals described in 1758
Articles containing video clips
Taxa named by Carl Linnaeus
Door County, Wisconsin